The ACM Conference on Information and Knowledge Management (CIKM, pronounced ) is an annual computer science research conference dedicated to information management (IM) and knowledge management (KM). Since the first event in 1992, the conference has evolved into one of the major forums for research on database management, information retrieval, and knowledge management. The conference is noted for its interdisciplinarity, as it brings together communities that otherwise often publish at separate venues. Recent editions have attracted well beyond 500 participants. In addition to the main research program, the conference also features a number of workshops, tutorials, and industry presentations.

For many years, the conference was held in the USA. Since 2005, venues in other countries have been selected as well. Locations include:
 1992: Baltimore, Maryland, USA 
 1993: Washington, D.C., USA 
 1994: Gaithersburg, Maryland, USA 
 1995: Baltimore, Maryland, USA,
 1996: Rockville, Maryland, USA
 1997: Las Vegas, Nevada, USA
 1998: Bethesda, Maryland, USA
 1999: Kansas City, Missouri, USA
 2000: Washington, D.C., USA
 2001: Atlanta, Georgia, USA
 2002: McLean, Virginia, USA
 2003: New Orleans, Louisiana, USA
 2004: Washington, D.C., USA
 2005: Bremen, Germany
 2006: Arlington, Virginia, USA
 2007: Lisbon, Portugal 
 2008: Napa Valley, California, USA 
 2009: Hong Kong, China 
 2010: Toronto, Ontario, Canada
 2011: Glasgow, Scotland, UK 
 2016: Indianapolis, USA 
 2017: Singapore, Singapore 
 2018: Turin, Italy 
 2019: Beijing, China 
 2020: Galway, Ireland

See also
 SIGIR Conference

References

External links 
 

Computer science conferences
Association for Computing Machinery conferences